VC Dynamo Moscow is a Russian professional men's volleyball team based in Moscow which is playing in the Super League. Dynamo Moscow won the title of Russian Championionship for times (2006, 2008, 2021, 2022). The club won a silver and two bronze medals at the CEV Champions League.

Achievements
CEV Champions League
Runners-up (1): 2010
Third place (2): 2007, 2011
CEV Cup
Winners (4): 1985, 2012, 2015, 2021
Third place (1): 1990
USSR / Russian Championship
Winners (9): 1945, 1946, 1947, 1948, 1951, 2006, 2008, 2021, 2022
Runners-up (14): 1950, 1952, 1953, 1958, 1984, 1985, 1988, 1989, 2004, 2005, 2007, 2011, 2012, 2016
Third place (10): 1949, 1965, 1980, 1983, 1986, 1992, 1993, 2002, 2010, 2015
USSR / Russian Cup
Winners (6): 1950, 1951, 1952, 2006, 2008, 2020
Russian SuperCup
Winners (4): 2008, 2009, 2021, 2022

European record

Team Roster
Team roster – season 2021/2022

Notable players
Notable, former or current players of club, who are medalist of intercontinental tournaments in national teams or clubs.

References

External links
Official site

volleyball
Russian volleyball clubs
Volleyball clubs established in 1926
1926 establishments in Russia